Baker's percentage is a notation method indicating the proportion of an ingredient relative to the flour used in a recipe when making breads, cakes, muffins, and other baked goods. It is also referred to as baker's math, and may be indicated by a phrase such as based on flour weight. It is sometimes called formula percentage, a phrase that refers to the sum of a set of baker's percentages. Baker's percentage expresses a ratio in percentages of each ingredient's weight to the total flour weight:

For example, in a recipe that calls for 10 pounds of flour and 5 pounds of water, the corresponding baker's percentages are 100% for the flour and 50% for the water. Because these percentages are stated with respect to the weight of flour rather than with respect to the weight of all ingredients, the sum of these percentages always exceeds 100%.

Flour-based recipes are more precisely conceived as baker's percentages, and more accurately measured using weight instead of volume. The uncertainty in using volume measurements follows from the fact that flour settles in storage and therefore does not have a constant density.

Baker's percentages
A yeast-dough formula could call for the following list of ingredients, presented as a series of baker's percentages:
{| class=wikitable style="text-align:center;"
|-
| align=left | flour ||  100% 
|-
| align=left | water || 60%
|-
| align=left | yeast || 1%
|-
| align=left | salt || 2%
|-
| align=left | oil || 1%
|}

Conversions

There are several common conversions that are used with baker's percentages.  Converting baker's percentages to ingredient weights is one. Converting known ingredient weights to baker percentages is another.  Conversion to true percentages, or based on total weight, is helpful to calculate unknown ingredient weights from a desired total or formula weight.

Using baker's percentages
To derive the ingredient weights when any weight of flour Wf is chosen:

{| class=wikitable style="text-align:center;"
|-
! align=left colspan=2 | Baker'spercentage || colspan=2 |weights 
|-
! align=left | ingredient  || % ||  method 1 || method 2
|-
| align=left | flour ||  100%  || align=left |  Wf * 1.00 ||align=left |  Wf * 100%
|-
| align=left | water || 35% || align=left |  Wf * 0.35 ||align=left |  Wf * 35%
|-
| align=left | milk || 35% || align=left |  Wf * 0.35 ||align=left |  Wf * 35%
|-
| align=left | fresh yeast || 4% || align=left |  Wf * 0.04 ||align=left |  Wf * 4%
|-
| align=left | salt || 1.8% || align=left |  Wf * 0.018  ||align=left |  Wf * 1.8%
|}

In the example below, 2 lb and 10 kg of flour weights have been calculated. Depending on the desired weight unit, only one of the following four weight columns is used:

{| class=wikitable style="text-align:center;"
|-
! colspan=2 rowspan=2 | Baker'spercentage || colspan=4 | weights
|-
! colspan=2 | 2 lb ||colspan=2 | 10 kg 
|-
! align=left | ingredient  || % || lb || oz || kg || g
|-
| align=left | flour ||  100%  || 2 || 32 || 10 ||  10000 
|-
| align=left | water || 35% || 0.7 || 11.2 || 3.5 || 3500
|-
| align=left | milk || 35% || 0.7 || 11.2 || 3.5 || 3500
|-
| align=left | fresh yeast || 4% || 0.08 || 1.28 || 0.4 || 400
|-
| align=left | salt || 1.8% ||  0.036  ||  0.576  ||  0.18  || 180
|}

Creating baker's percentages
The baker has determined how much a recipe's ingredients weigh, and uses uniform decimal weight units. All ingredient weights are divided by the flour weight to obtain a ratio, then the ratio is multiplied by 100% to yield the baker's percentage for that ingredient:

{| class=wikitable style="text-align:center;"
|-
! align=left | ingredient  ||  weight  ||    || colspan=2 | × 100% 
|-
| align=left | flour || 10 kg || 10 kg ÷ 10 kg = 1.000 ||=|| 100%
|-
| align=left | water || 3.5 kg || 3.5 kg ÷ 10 kg = 0.350 ||=|| 35%
|-
| align=left | milk || 3.5 kg || 3.5 kg ÷ 10 kg = 0.350 ||=|| 35%
|-
| align=left | fresh yeast || 0.4 kg || 0.4 kg ÷ 10 kg = 0.040 ||=|| 4%
|-
| align=left | salt || 0.18 kg || 0.18 kg ÷ 10 kg = 0.018 ||=|| 1.8%
|}

Due to the canceling of uniform weight units, the baker may employ any desired system of measurement (metric or avoirdupois, etc.) when using a baker's percentage to determine an ingredient's weight. Generally, the baker finds it easiest to use the system of measurement that is present on the available tools.

Formula percentage and total mass
{| class=wikitable style="text-align:center;"
|-
! Ingredient || baker's% || true%
|-
| align=left | flour || style="color:green;"| 100%  ||style="color:maroon;"|  56.88% 
|-
| align=left | water || 35% ||style="color:maroon;"| 19.91%
|-
| align=left | milk || 35% ||style="color:maroon;"| 19.91%
|-
| align=left | fresh yeast  || 4% ||style="color:maroon;"| 2.28%
|-
| align=left | salt || 1.8% ||style="color:maroon;"| 1.02%
|-
! align=right | Total ||style="color:red;"| 175.8% ||style="color:green;"| 100%
|}

The total or sum of the baker's percentages is called the formula percentage. The sum of the ingredient masses is called the formula mass (or formula "weight"). Here are some interesting calculations:

 The flour's mass times the formula percentage equals the formula mass:

 An ingredient's mass is obtained by multiplying the formula mass by that ingredient's true percentage; because an ingredient's true percentage is that ingredient's baker's percentage divided by the formula percentage expressed as parts per hundred, an ingredient's mass can also be obtained by multiplying the formula mass by the ingredient's baker's percentage and then dividing the result by the formula percentage:

Thus, it is not necessary to calculate each ingredient's true percentage in order to calculate each ingredient's mass, provided the formula mass and the baker's percentages are known.

 Ingredients' masses can also be obtained by first calculating the mass of the flour then using baker's percentages to calculate remaining ingredient masses:

 The two methods of calculating the mass of an ingredient are equivalent:

Weights and densities

The use of customary U.S. units can sometimes be awkward and the metric system makes these conversions simpler. In the metric system, there are only a small number of basic measures of relevance to cooking: the gram (g) for weight, the liter (L) for volume, the meter (m) for length, and degrees Celsius (°C) for temperature; multiples and sub-multiples are indicated by prefixes, two commonly used metric cooking prefixes are milli- (m-) and kilo- (k-).  Intra-metric conversions involve moving the decimal point.

Common avoirdupois and metric weight equivalences:
1 pound (lb) = 16 ounces (oz)
1 kilogram (kg) = 1,000 grams (g) = 2.20462262 lb
1 lb = 453.59237 g = 0.45359237 kg
1 oz = 28.3495231 g.

In four different English-language countries of recipe and measuring-utensil markets, approximate cup volumes range from 236.59 to 284.1 milliliters (mL). Adaptation of volumetric recipes can be made with density approximations:

{|class=wikitable
|-
!style="background: #D8D8D8;" colspan=8|Volume to mass conversions for some common cooking ingredients
|-
!rowspan=2|ingredient
!rowspan=2|densityg/mL
!colspan=2|metric cup250 mL
!colspan=2|imperial cup≈284 mL
!colspan=2|U.S. customary cup≈237 mL
|-
!g 
!oz
!g
!oz
!g
!oz
|-
|water
|align=center|1
|align=center|249–250
|align=center|8.8
|align=center|283–284
|align=center|10
|align=center|236–237
|align=center|8.3
|-
|granulated sugar
|align=center|0.8
|align=center|200
|align=center|7.0
|align=center|230
|align=center|8.0
|align=center|190
|align=center|6.7
|-
|wheat flour
|align=center|0.5–0.6
|align=center|120–150
|align=center|4.4–5.3
|align=center|140–170
|align=center|5.0–6.0
|align=center|120–140
|align=center|4.2–5.0
|-
|table salt
|align=center|1.2
|align=center|300
|align=center|10.6
|align=center|340
|align=center|12.0
|align=center|280
|align=center|10.0
|}

Due to volume and density ambiguities, a different approach involves volumetrically measuring the ingredients, then using scales or balances of appropriate accuracy and error ranges to weigh them, and recording the results.  With this method, occasionally an error or outlier of some kind occurs.

Drawbacks
Baker's percentages do not accurately reflect the impact of the amount of gluten-forming proteins in the flour on the final product and therefore may need to be adjusted from country to country, or even miller to miller, depending on definitions of terms like "bread flour" and actual protein content.  Manipulation of known flour-protein levels can be calculated with a Pearson square.

In home baking, the amounts of ingredients such as salt or yeast expressed by mass may be too small to measure accurately on the scales used by most home cooks. For these ingredients, it may be easier to express quantities by volume, based on standard densities. For this reason, many breadmaking books that are targeted to home bakers provide both percentages and volumes for common batch sizes.

Besides the need for appropriate readability scales, a kitchen calculator is helpful when working directly from baker's percentages.

Advantages
Baker's percentages enable the user to:
 compare recipes more easily (i.e., which are drier, saltier, sweeter, etc.).
 spot a bad recipe, or predict its baked characteristics.
 alter or add a single-ingredient percentage without changing the other ingredients' percentages.
 measure uniformly an ingredient where the quantity per unit may vary (as with eggs).
 scale accurately and easily for different batch sizes.

Common Formulations
Common formulations for bread include 100% flour, 60% water/liquid, 1% yeast, 2% salt and 1% oil, lard or butter.

Dough hydration
In a recipe, the baker's percentage for water is referred to as the "hydration"; it is indicative of the stickiness of the dough and the "crumb" of the bread. Lower hydration rates (e.g., 50–57%) are typical for bagels and pretzels, and medium hydration levels (58–65%) are typical for breads and rolls. Higher hydration levels are used to produce more and larger holes, as is common in artisan breads such as baguettes or ciabatta. Doughs are also often classified by the terms stiff, firm, soft, and slack.  Batters are more liquid doughs. Muffins are a type of drop batter while pancakes are a type of pour batter.

{| class=wikitable style="text-align:left;"
|-
! colspan=2 style="text-align:center;"| Doughs
|-
| Very stiff||< 57%
|-
| Stiff to firm||57-65%
|-
| Soft || 65-70%
|-
| Soft to slack || 70-80%
|-
! colspan=2 style="text-align:center;"| Batters 
|-
| Drop || 95%
|-
| Pour || 190%
|}

Notes

References

External links
Baker's percentage
Sample recipe
Understanding The Baker's Percentage - Video A video that explains in detail the baker's percentage, its benefits, and best uses.
Baker's percentage calculator

Baking
Percentages